Not Too Sharp is an all-male a cappella group from the University of New Hampshire in Durham, New Hampshire, USA. Begun in 2002, the 9-12 man group performs live on the college campus, at other groups’ venues, and in the New Hampshire community. Their annual benefit show supports the American Cancer Society. The ensemble has previously competed twice in the International Championship of Collegiate A Cappella in 2015 and 2018. The Recorded Acappella Review Board says of Not Too Sharp, “All male, slightly goofy and possessed of an infectious energy… Charisma just drips out of the speakers.” In 2010, the group was presented with a "Best of New Hampshire" award for contemporary a cappella.

History

UNH students Jamie Saucier '03, Jason Reed '05 and Kevin Cleary '05 conceived the group during a trip with the UNH Chorus to perform background vocals at a Barry Manilow concert. A discussion of a classmate who had been diagnosed with multiple myeloma, an incurable but treatable cancer, led them to gather a group who could perform to raise money for cancer research. That friend later became the group's first business manager, and only female member.

The group was barbershop-based in its early days, something that could distinguish them from the other a cappella groups on campus at the time. The very first show was held in the basement floor of Congreve Hall in 2002. The group rehearsed during the walk across campus, and relied on paper music during the show. This was the first of over 25 performances for the group in their first year, earning them recognition as “the group who sings everywhere." The group's first major concert was held May 3, 2003, in UNH's Johnson Theatre, hosted by members of fellow group Alabaster Blue. Over 200 people attended this first semester-culminating show, raising $2,000 dollars for the American Cancer Society. It was also when the group debuted its first album, "On Our Way," which consisted of many traditional barbershop arrangements, recorded live in the MUB Theater.

Since the first year, the group has continued to perform live around the region, performing at commencements, weddings, private parties, and even the New Hampshire State House. Their audiences have included school kids, the elderly, and fellow college students. Each year they have hosted a benefit show, adding to the total donated to cancer research, and building ties with other initiatives like UNH's Wildcat Santa toy drive.

A self-titled album released in 2006 reflected the group's growing interest in popular modern music. Fall Out Boy's track “Sugar, We’re Going Down” and classic rock like The Eagles’ “Hotel California” appeared alongside barbershop arrangements like “Chordbuster’s March." The 2009 album "Shifting Gears" furthered the group's move away from its traditional barbershop roots, with tracks like Spoon's “The Underdog” and Kelly Clarkson's “Gone.” A unique arrangement of The Doobie Brothers’ “Black Water” also demonstrated the group's talents beyond singing, as music director Harrison Kisiel contributed an arrangement that, according to critics at the Recorded A Cappella Review Board, "solves this Riddle of the Sphinx with a head-turning arrangement packed with creativity, maturity, and deep southern funk."

In 2011, the fellas went back to the studio to track their 3rd studio album entitled "May Contain Nuts." Highlights of the album include a soul-filled mash-up of jazz classic "St. Louis Blues" by W.C. Handy and Stevie Wonder's "Superstition," plus a powerful take on Phil Collin's "Take Me Home." But the group made its first break into the national a cappella scene with the high-energy take on Elvis Presley's "Rubberneckin'."  It was selected for the national collegiate a cappella compilation album "Voices Only 2012" and featured the entire group with a brilliant arrangement by Mark Taipan.

The hits kept coming with Not Too Sharp's most recent foray into studio a cappella, "Haywire." With genius producer David Longo and the rest of The Vocal Company at the helm, NTS received several national and international accolades, solidifying their place in the a cappella scene. The passionate take on Ed Sheeran's "The A Team" was selected as for the "Best of College A Cappella 2014" compilation, featuring an emotional solo by Alex Rich. Next came the Contemporary A Cappella Recording Award nomination for Not Too Sharp's first original song, "Electric," with a solo by Anthony Richards, written by members Eric Schaaf and Jim McCann, and co-written by producer David Longo. In 2014, Not Too Sharp was placed on "Voices Only 2014" with their cover of the rock cover of The Crash Kings' "Mountain Man."

During the 2014-2015 academic year, the group reached new heights. They  appeared on The Today Show with Kathie Lee and Hoda, and sang at the inauguration of NH Governor Maggie Hassan. The group also released a music video for their cover of Rusted Root's 'Send Me On My Way' that achieved semi-virality, accumulating over 100,000 views within a year of its release. The group also released a single, their cover of Darius Rucker's version of Wagon Wheel. Lastly, the group won Organization of the Year, as awarded by the MUB Office of Student Involvement and Leadership.

Music
The group was barbershop-based in its early days. The first album, On Our Way, consisted of many such traditional barbershop arrangements. It was released in 2003, during the group's first year in existence. The songs were recorded live in UNH's MUB Theater.

A self-titled album was released in 2006. The new album reflected the group's growing interest in popular modern music. Fall Out Boy’s track “Sugar, We’re Going Down” and classic rock like The Eagles’ “Hotel California” appeared alongside barbershop arrangements like “Chordbuster’s March." The 2009 album Shifting Gears completed the group's move away from its traditional barbershop roots, with tracks like Spoon's “The Underdog” and Kelly Clarkson’s “Gone.” A unique arrangement of The Doobie Brothers’ “Black Water” also demonstrated the group's adventurous nature.

December 2011 marked the group's third studio album release, May Contain Nuts. The title is a play on the group's performance style (as evidenced in the Barenaked Ladies cover "Grade 9") and the abbreviation NTS. The album's sound reflected the advancing field of vocal music production in general and of returning producer Tim Bongiovanni specifically. These developments are demonstrated in an adaptation of Elvis Presley's song "Rubberneckin'" which added features like a modern, driving vocal percussion drumbeat and layered group solos. The song was subsequently selected for inclusion on the best of college a cappella compilation album Voices Only 2012.

Philanthropy
An annual benefit concert raises money for the American Cancer Society. The shows generated approximately $10,000 for the ACS in just the group's first five years.

Auditions
Since the group consists of only current UNH students, graduating students must be replaced each year, leading to a constantly rotating lineup. Any UNH undergraduate or graduate is invited to audition during the fall semester and rolling auditions may occur through the academic school year. Reach out to the group to find out more!

Discography

Notes

Collegiate a cappella groups
University of New Hampshire
Musical groups established in 2002
2002 establishments in New Hampshire